António 'Toni' Leonel Vidigal (born 1 March 1975) is a Portuguese retired professional footballer who played as a central midfielder.

Football career
Born in Elvas, Portalegre District, Vidigal made his senior debuts at only 16, with O Elvas C.A.D. in the third division. In 1994 he signed with G.D. Estoril Praia in the second level, going on to remain the following seven years in that tier, also representing Vitória de Setúbal, F.C. Penafiel and Varzim SC, achieving Primeira Liga promotion with the latter in 2001.

After two seasons with Varzim in the top flight (45 games, one goal) and a third in the second division, Vidigal signed with C.D. Portosantense in level three. Aged 31, he returned to his first senior club, now in the fourth tier, closing out his career in 2010 after a brief spell with amateurs Club Sintra Football.

Personal life
Vidigal had four brothers who were also footballers (from a total of 13 siblings): Beto, Luís, Lito and Jorge. The second represented Portugal internationally, whilst the third opted to appear for Angola; his nephew, André, was also involved in the sport professionally.

References

External links

1975 births
Living people
People from Elvas
Portuguese sportspeople of Angolan descent
Portuguese footballers
Association football midfielders
Primeira Liga players
Liga Portugal 2 players
Segunda Divisão players
O Elvas C.A.D. players
G.D. Estoril Praia players
Vitória F.C. players
F.C. Penafiel players
Varzim S.C. players
Sportspeople from Portalegre District